"Nobody Should Have to Love This Way" is a song recorded by American country music artist Crystal Gayle.  It was released in July 1987 as the third single from the album Straight to the Heart.  The song reached #26 on the Billboard Hot Country Singles & Tracks chart.  The song was written by Tommy Rocco, Charlie Black and Rory Bourke.

Chart performance

References

1987 singles
1986 songs
Crystal Gayle songs
Songs written by Charlie Black
Songs written by Rory Bourke
Songs written by Tommy Rocco
Song recordings produced by Jim Ed Norman
Warner Records singles